The 2016 South East Asian Men's U20 Volleyball Championships was held in Nay Pyi Taw, Myanmar from 2 to 6 July 2016. 7 teams entered for this tournament.

Pools composition

Preliminary round 
All times are UTC+06:30.

Pool A 

|}

|}

Pool B 

|}

|}

Final round 
All times are UTC+06:30.

Semifinals 

|}

5th place 

|}

3rd place 

|}

Final 

|}

Final standing

Awards
MVP:   Kantapat Koonmee

References

External links
AVC official website

South East Asian
South East Asian
Volleyball in Myanmar
Youth volleyball
2016 in youth sport